Grenadine is a non-alcoholic red syrup.

Grenadine may also refer to:
 Grenadine (cloth), a light silk weave
 Grenadine (band), American band comprising members of Tsunami, Unrest, and Eggs
 Grenadine Records, a record label
 Grenadine Airways
 Grenadines, a group of islands

See also
 Saint Vincent and the Grenadines, a nation
 Granadaene, an organic chemical